Samsung SCH-B450 is a gaming phone released by Samsung in July 2006 in South Korea. It features a 2.2-inch TFT-LCD (portrait/landscape modes), a 2.0-megapixel camera, a DMB receiver for mobile television and 3D-gaming capabilities. It was primarily designed for video games playing experience.

See also
N-Gage
N-Gage QD
Xperia Play

Samsung mobile phones
Mobile phones introduced in 2006